"Battle Flag" (or "Battleflag")  is a 1997 song by American funk rock band Pigeonhed which appeared on their 1997 album The Full Sentence. In 1998, the song was remixed by the British big beat group Lo Fidelity Allstars for the Pigeonhed remix album Flash Bulb Emergency Overflow Cavalcade of Remixes.

The "Battleflag" remix, credited to "Lo Fidelity Allstars (featuring Pigeonhed)" was issued as a single in November 1998 and appeared on Lo Fidelity Allstars' album How to Operate with a Blown Mind. Although the song was a minor hit in the United Kingdom, reaching No. 36 on the UK Singles Chart, it was a major hit on American alternative rock radio and reached No. 6 on the Billboard Modern Rock Tracks chart.

Media appearances
The song was featured in NBC's prime-time medical drama ER, most notably in the Season 6 episode, "Be Still My Heart", in which medical student Lucy Knight (Kellie Martin) and Dr. John Carter (Noah Wyle) are stabbed by schizophrenic patient Paul Sobriki (David Krumholtz). The song was used again in the Season 8 episode, "Beyond Repair", in which Carter meets Sobriki again. Other uses include season three episode eleven of Showtime's drama Queer as Folk, as well as a season one episode of The WB's Smallville, a season three episode of CBS's Person of Interest, and a season one episode of HBO's The Sopranos. It also featured in the films Running with the Devil, Coyote Ugly, Forces of Nature, Mean Machine and Very Bad Things, and the trailers for Charlie's Angels, The 51st State, Drillbit Taylor, Starsky & Hutch, Play It to the Bone, and Duke Nukem Forever. The song was also used on the 2000 WWF (now WWE) videotape Eve of Destruction. Most recently, the song was used at the end of Season 1 episode “Hand to Mouth” on the Apple TV+ series Black Bird.

Track listing

1998 UK single #1
"Battleflag (Full Version)"
"Pony Pressure"
"Battleflag (Bonus Beats)"

1998 UK single #2
"Battleflag (Radio Edit)"
"Battleflag (Space Raiders)"
"Battleflag (Live At The Big Beat Boutique)"

1998 US CD single
"Battle Flag [Radio Version]" – 3:54
"Battle Flag (Callout Hook #1)" – 0:10
"Battle Flag (Callout Hook #2)" – 0:05

1999 US 12"
"Battle Flag" – 5:29
"Blisters on My Brain" – 7:09
"Pony Pressure" – 4:48
"Vision Incision" – 5:24

Several more versions of the single could be found at shawnsmithsinger.com

References

1998 songs
1998 singles
Music videos directed by Jake Nava
Pigeonhed songs
Columbia Records singles